Yeongdeungpo Market Station is a station on Seoul Subway Line 5 in Yeongdeungpo-gu, Seoul.

Station layout

Vicinity
Exit 1 : Yeongjung Elementary School
Exit 2 : Yeongdong Elementary School
Exit 3 : Yeongdeungpo Market
Exit 4 : Jogwang Market

References

Railway stations opened in 1996
Seoul Metropolitan Subway stations
Metro stations in Yeongdeungpo District